Paul David Dakeyne (born 30 January 1961), known by his stage name Tinman, is an English house music producer/remixer from Hull, East Riding of Yorkshire. In 1994, his single "Eighteen Strings" (also written as "18 Strings") became an international club hit. It was rumoured that the original bootleg recording of "Eighteen Strings" contained a sample of the riff from "Smells Like Teen Spirit" by Nirvana, and that the usage of the sample was disallowed, therefore it was reproduced for commercial release. However, the riffs from the bootleg and commercial release were both produced by Dakeyne. The song was a Top 10 hit in the UK Singles Chart.

In addition to this commercial success, Dakeyne also remixed many tracks for DMC which were released on a "DJ Only" basis.

Singles

References

External links
 

1961 births
Living people
English DJs
English house musicians
English electronic musicians
English dance musicians
English record producers
Remixers
Musicians from Kingston upon Hull
Electronic dance music DJs